"Tomorrow Waltz" is a song recorded by Japanese musician/singer Toshinobu Kubota. It was released on January 27, 2010, as the third single from Kubota's fifteenth studio album Timeless Fly.

Background
"Tomorrow Waltz" was released on January 27, 2010, as the third single. The single was also released with a DVD containing the music video for "Ooh wee rida", a song featured on the single "Tomorrow Waltz". "Tomorrow Waltz" was written by Kubota and arranged by Yoichiro Kakizaki. The song became the theme song for NHK drama show "No Tomorrow". The song "Star Light" was also released on January 27, 2010, on the B-side of "Tomorrow Waltz".

Chart performance
"Tomorrow Waltz" peaked at number 22 on the Oricon Daily Singles chart and number 36 on the Oricon Weekly Singles chart.

Track listing
CD Single
Tomorrow Waltz
Star Light
Ooh Wee Rida

Limited edition DVD
Ooh Wee Rida (Music video)

Charts

References

2010 singles
2010 songs
Toshinobu Kubota songs
Songs written by Toshinobu Kubota
SME Records singles